Ros Mey (June 30, 1925 – December 12, 2010) was a Cambodian-born American Buddhist monk and survivor of the Khmer Rouge regime. Mey was the Chov Atika, or head monk, of Wat Thormikaram, the first ethnic Khmer Buddhist temple in the United States, which is located in Providence, Rhode Island.

Early life in Cambodia 
Mey was born in Svay Rolom, Kandal in Cambodia on June 30, 1925. He was the fifth child born to Ouch Mey (his father) and Soeum Mon (his mother), having four older sisters and a younger brother.

In 1945, he married Saythun Mey and sired seven children, three boys and four girls.

Mey originally worked as a land surveyor for the Cambodian government until the Khmer Rouge took power in 1975, establishing Democratic Kampuchea.

Escape from Cambodia 
An estimated three million people would be killed by the Khmer Rouge, including four of Mey's children – three daughters and one son. Mey and his surviving family managed to escape the country in 1979 and fled to the Khao-I-Dang refugee camp across the border in Thailand.

Mey and his family would ultimately become one of the thousands of Cambodian refugees who would be resettled in the U.S. state of Rhode Island. After a few years living as refugees, he and his family arrived in Rhode Island on February 12, 1982.

In 1993, Ros Mey was ordained a Buddhist monk at the Wat Thormikaram temple in Providence, Rhode Island, when he was 62 years old.  In 1998, he became Chov Atika & President of the temple.

He died at the temple in Providence on December 12, 2010, at the age of 85.

References

2010 deaths
American Buddhist monks
Cambodian emigrants to the United States
Clergy from Providence, Rhode Island
Buddhism in Rhode Island

1925 births